National Highway NH 34 (NH 34) is a National Highway in India. It runs from Gangotri Dham in Uttarakhand to Lakhnadon in Madhya Pradesh, passing through the state of Uttar Pradesh.

Route 
Uttarakhand

Gangotri Dham, Bhatwari, Uttarkashi, Dharasu, Tehri, Ampata, Rishikesh, Haridwar - Uttar Pradesh border.

Uttar Pradesh
Najibabad, Bijnore, Meerut, Mawana, Ghaziabad, Bulandshahr, Aligarh, Sikandra Rao(Hathras) Etah, Kannauj, Kanpur, Hamirpur, Mahoba - Madhya Pradesh border.

Madhya Pradesh
Chhatarpur, Hirapur, Damoh, Jabalpur, Lakhnadon.

Junctions

  First junction at Dharasu
  Terminal near Lakhnadon.
  Junction at Sikandra Rao

See also 

 List of National Highways in India
 List of National Highways in India by state

References

External links
 NH 34 on OpenStreetMap

National highways in India
National Highways in Uttarakhand
National Highways in Uttar Pradesh
National Highways in Madhya Pradesh